Shatursky District is an administrative and municipal district (raion), one of the thirty-six in Moscow Oblast, Russia. It is located in the east of the oblast. Its administrative center is the town of Shatura. Population: 72,087 (2010 Census);  The population of Shatura accounts for 45.6% of the district's total population.

Ecology

Just like in all of the Meshchera Lowlands, the district contains many forests, rivers, lakes, and swamps. Its forests are mostly coniferous and pine, and occupy about 45% of the total territory of the district.

There are about forty-eight different lakes located within the district, including Svyatoye, Muromskoye, Velikoye, Karasevo, Spasskoye, Torbeyevskoye, Dolgoye, Glubokoye, and Dubovoye. There are also six different rivers that pass through its territory.

Fires occur often in the district during summer. The most memorable ones were in 1972 and 2002.

References

Notes

Sources

Districts of Moscow Oblast
 
